Scutus anatinus is a species of sea snail or limpet, a marine gastropod mollusk in the family Fissurellidae, the keyhole limpets and slit limpets.

Description
The length of the shell attains 73.7 mm.

Distribution
This marine species occurs off Australia.

References

 Abbott, R. T. & Dance, S. P. (1986). Compendium of sea shells. American Malacologists, Inc: Melbourne, Florida

External links
 Donovan, E. (1808). Conchology, plate VI. In: Rees, A. (Ed.), 1802–1820, The Cyclopædia; or, Universal Dictionary of Arts, Sciences, and Literature. Longman, Hurst, Rees, Orme and Brown, London. Plates Vol. V. Natural History
 Quoy, J. R. C. & Gaimard, J. P. (1832-1835). Voyage de la corvette l'Astrolabe : exécuté par ordre du roi, pendant les années 1826-1827-1828-1829, sous le commandement de M. J. Dumont d'Urville. Zoologie.
 Dillwyn, L. W. (1817). A descriptive catalogue of Recent shells, arranged according to the Linnean method; with particular attention to the synonymy. London: John and Arthur Arch. Vol. 1: 1-580; Vol. 2: 581-1092 + index
 Hedley, C. (1917). Studies on Australian Mollusca. Part XIII. Proceedings of the Linnean Society of New South Wales. 41: 680–719, pls 45-52

Fissurellidae
Gastropods described in 1820